Leptis may refer to:
 Either of two cities of antiquity
 Leptis Magna, Great Leptis, or simply Leptis, known as Lebda to modern-day residents of Libya, a prominent city of the Roman Empire
 Leptis Parva, Leptis Minor, or Leptiminus, an ancient city on the Gulf of Hammamet along the eastern coast of Tunisia, near the modern city of Monastir
 Leptis, a synonym of the legume genus Leobordea